Héctor Ochoa (5 July 1942 – 20 May 2020) was an Argentine footballer who competed in the 1964 Summer Olympics.

Ochoa was born in the Parque Patricios neighborhood of Buenos Aires, but was brought up in Lincoln. He began his career at Atlanta in 1962.

Ochoa died on 20 May 2020, aged 77.

References

External links
 

1942 births
2020 deaths
Association football forwards
Argentine footballers
Olympic footballers of Argentina
Footballers at the 1964 Summer Olympics
Club Atlético Atlanta footballers
Deportivo Morón footballers
Deportivo Español footballers
San Telmo footballers
Rivadavia de Lincoln footballers
Argentine Primera División players
Footballers from Buenos Aires
People from Lincoln Partido